Mitogen-activated protein kinase 8 (also known as JNK1) is a ubiquitous enzyme that in humans is encoded by the MAPK8 gene.

Function 

The protein encoded by this gene is a member of the MAP kinase and JNK family. MAP kinases act as an integration point for multiple biochemical signals, and are involved in a wide variety of cellular processes such as proliferation, differentiation, transcription regulation and development. This kinase is activated by various cell stimuli, and targets specific transcription factors, and thus mediates immediate-early gene expression in response to cell stimuli. The activation of this kinase by tumor-necrosis factor alpha (TNF-alpha) is found to be required for TNF-alpha-induced apoptosis. This kinase is also involved in UV radiation-induced apoptosis, which is thought to be related to the cytochrome c-mediated cell death pathway. Studies of the mouse counterpart of this gene suggested that this kinase play a key role in T cell proliferation, apoptosis and differentiation. Four alternately spliced transcript variants encoding distinct isoforms have been reported.  MAPK8 contains multiple amino acid sites that are phosphorylated and ubiquitinated.

Interactions 

MAPK8 has been shown to interact with:   

 Activating transcription factor 2, 
 C-jun,
 CRK, 
 DUSP10, 
 DUSP1, 
 DUSP22, 
 GSTP1, 
 IRS1, 
 ITCH, 
 MAP2K4, 
 MAP2K7, 
 MAP3K1 
 MAP3K2, 
 MAPK8IP1, 
 MAPK8IP3, 
 Myc, 
 REL, 
 SH3BP5,  and
 SPIB.

References

Further reading

External links 
 MAP Kinase Resource  .

EC 2.7.11